was a Japanese career diplomat and cabinet minister of Meiji-era Japan.

Early life 
He was born Satō Shingoro in Sakura city, Shimōsa Province (present-day Chiba prefecture), as the son of Satō Taizen, a physician practising "Dutch medicine" for the Sakura Domain. He sometimes referred to himself as "Satō Tosaburō". He was adopted as a child by Hayashi Dokai, a physician in the service of the Tokugawa shogunate, from whom he received the name Hayashi Tadasu. He learned English at the Hepburn Academy (the forerunner of Meiji Gakuin University) in Yokohama .

From 1866 to 1868, Hayashi studied in Great Britain at University College School and King's College London as one of fourteen young Japanese students (including Kikuchi Dairoku) sent by the Tokugawa government on the advice of the then British foreign minister Edward Stanley, 15th Earl of Derby.

Hayashi returned home in the midst of the Boshin War of the Meiji Restoration, and joined with Tokugawa loyalists led by Enomoto Takeaki, whom he accompanied to Hokkaidō with the remnants of the Shogunate Army and its Navy. He was captured by the Imperial forces after the final defeat of the Republic of Ezo at the Battle of Hakodate and imprisoned in Yokohama.

Released in 1871 by Kanagawa governor Mutsu Munemitsu, he was recruited to work for the Meiji government in 1871, and because of his language abilities and previous overseas experience was selected to accompany the Iwakura Mission to Europe and the United States in 1871–1873.

Government officer 
Being a member of the Iwakura Mission in the Britain, he was instructed by Yamao Yozo to arrange appointment of the teaching staff for the Engineering Institution (Japan) in the end of 1872. He returned home with the staff lead by Henry Dyer as the principal, and endeavoured to set up the Imperial College of Engineering, Tokyo as an officer of the Engineering Institution of the Ministry of Public Works.

In 1875 he married Gamo Misao (1858 – 1942). They had a daughter and a son, Kiku and Masanosuke.

Political career 
After the Ministry of Public Works was abolished, he moved to the Ministry of Post and Telecommunication, then was appointed governor of Kagawa Prefecture, and then of Hyōgo Prefecture. In 1891, he was appointed Vice-Minister for Foreign Affairs. He was elevated to the title of baron (danshaku) in the kazoku peerage in 1895.

Hayashi was appointed as resident minister to the court of Qing dynasty China at the Japanese legation in Beijing, then resident minister to Russia in St Petersburg, and finally resident minister to Great Britain. While serving in London from 1900, he worked to successfully conclude the Anglo-Japanese Alliance and signed on behalf of the government of Japan on 30 January 1902. He was elevated to the title of viscount (shishaku) in February 1902.

On 2 December 1905 Hayashi became the first Japanese ambassador to the Court of St James's, as diplomatic relations were upgraded between the Empire of Japan and the British Empire. He was accompanied by his wife. At that time Sir Claude MacDonald was Hayashi's opposite number in Tokyo.

On becoming Foreign Minister in the first Saionji cabinet in 1906, Hayashi concluded agreements with France (the Franco-Japanese Agreement of 1907) and Russia (the Russo-Japanese Agreement of 1907 and Russo-Japanese Agreement of 1910). He served as Minister of Communications in the second Saionji cabinet and as interim Foreign Minister (1911–12). He was elevated to the title of count (hakushaku) in 1907.

On contracting diabetes, Hayashi retired in 1912, and in June 1913 he fractured his thigh in an accident, resulting in an amputation. Hayashi died a month later, and his grave is at Aoyama Cemetery in Tokyo.

Honors

Titles
Baron (31 October 1895)
Viscount (27 February 1902)
Count (14 September 1907)

Decorations
Grand Cordon of the Order of the Sacred Treasure (31 October 1895)
Grand Cordon of the Order of the Rising Sun (27 December 1899)
Grand Cordon of the Order of the Rising Sun with Paulownia Flowers (1 April 1906)
 Knight Grand Cross of the Royal Victorian Order (GCVO) (4 July 1905)

Honorary degrees
 LL.D. (honorary) University of Cambridge – May 1902
 D.C.L. (honorary) University of Oxford – June 1902

Order of precedence
Third rank (21 July 1901)
Senior third rank (May 1910)

See also 
 Japan–United Kingdom relations
 Henry Petty-Fitzmaurice, 5th Marquess of Lansdowne – who signed the Anglo-Japanese alliance of 30 January 1902 for Britain when Hayashi signed for Japan
 Japanese students in the United Kingdom
 Kikuchi Dairoku
 Imperial Rescript on Education

References 
 The Secret Memoirs of Count Hayashi Tadasu, edited by A.M. Pooley, 1915, reprinted 2002

External links 

 Portrait of Hayashi Tadasu on the website of the National Diet Library, Tokyo

Notes

Ambassadors of Japan to the United Kingdom
Japanese expatriates in the United Kingdom
Foreign ministers of Japan
Government ministers of Japan
Governors of Kagawa Prefecture
Governors of Hyōgo Prefecture
People educated at University College School
Alumni of King's College London
Politicians from Chiba Prefecture
Kazoku
Meiji Restoration
People of Meiji-period Japan
Recipients of the Order of the Rising Sun
1850 births
1913 deaths
People from Sakura, Chiba
Honorary Knights Grand Cross of the Royal Victorian Order
Members of the Iwakura Mission